The Four-eyed Well is a historical water well in Magong City, Penghu County, Taiwan.

History
The well is thought to have been dug during the Yuan or Ming dynasties. It is registered as a class 3 historical monument in Penghu.

Architecture
It consists of a single cavity well with a depth of 5.6 meters and a diameter of 2 meters, covered with a stone slab through which are four holes for drawing water.

See also
 List of tourist attractions in Taiwan

Notes

References

Buildings and structures in Penghu County
Water wells in Taiwan